Downeast Cider House is an American craft hard cider company based in Boston, Massachusetts, United States. It was founded in 2011 by recent graduates of Bates College in Lewiston, Maine. The founders pursued their business to avoid finding "real" jobs after college, with the goal of creating a hard cider to taste like freshly pressed apple juice.

History
Originally, the three founders (Ross Brockman, Tyler Mosher, and Ben Manter) wanted to call the company Three Idiots, but found that name was taken. As they were starting in Maine, they then decided to name their cider house Downeast, which is a nautical term as well as a noun, as in "Downeasters".

Downeast Cider House has been located in four different production facilities. The first was located in the Central Maine Power mill in Waterville, Maine. The second was a warehouse in Leominster, MA. The third was in Charlestown, Boston, MA. The current facility is located at Jefferies Point in East Boston.

Ciders

Year round

Seasonal

Specialty 
Downeast Cider House offers small batch one-offs of cider ranging from barrel aged pomegranate flavored cider to a mango blend. They have also produced Hard Lemonade seasonally.

References

External links
Downeast Cider House (official website)

American ciders
Food and drink companies based in Boston
Manufacturing companies based in Boston